was an 8,520-ton Japanese ocean liner built in 1909 by Kawasaki Dockyard Co., Ltd. in Kobe. While steaming from Yokohama, Japan, to London during World War I, she was sunk in the Atlantic Ocean  to the west of the Isles of Scilly on 31 May 1917 by the Imperial German Navy submarine , with the loss of eight lives.

Miyazaki Maru has been cited as a possible source of the gutta-percha blocks inscribed with the name "Tjipetir" that began to wash up on the coasts of Western Europe in summer 2012.

References 

1909 ships
Ships built by Kawasaki Heavy Industries
Passenger ships of Japan
Maritime incidents in 1917
Ships sunk by German submarines in World War I
World War I shipwrecks in the Atlantic Ocean